Power Play is a 1978 British-Canadian political thriller film starring Peter O'Toole and David Hemmings, based on the 1968 non-fiction strategy book Coup d'État: A Practical Handbook by Edward N. Luttwak. The film was also known as Coup d'Etat. It was released on DVD in 2005 by New Star Video under the title A State of Shock.

Plot
A small group of military officers frustrated by the corruption and brutality of a fictional contemporary European government decide that they must overthrow the current administration. But the coup's leader worries that there is a spy in their group.

Colonel Narriman (Hemmings), an idealistic and soon-to-retire army officer, becomes sickened by the government's use of extra-judicial killing and torture to suppress the terrorist insurgency that their incompetence and corruption has fostered. Jean Rousseau persuades him that, instead of retiring, he should attempt to overthrow the regime for the good of the country.

Worried about infiltration by agents of the hated internal security chief Blair (Donald Pleasence), he emphasises operational security, as he knows he can expect no mercy if caught, while he builds the coup one important recruit at a time. A key such person is Colonel Zeller (O'Toole), whose armoured brigade is seen as vital for capturing the capital city quickly.

The final part of the film is the actual conduct of the coup attempt with exciting twists and surprises.

Cast
Peter O'Toole – Colonel Zeller 
David Hemmings – Colonel Narriman 
Donald Pleasence – Blair 
Barry Morse – Jean Rousseau
George Touliatos – Barrientos
Harvey Atkin – Anwar
August Schellenberg – Minh
Chuck Shamata – Hillsman
Alberta Watson—Donna

Production

The UK-Canada co-production was filmed in Canada and West Germany. Power Play includes scenes shot at the University of Toronto's University College quadrangle and hallways. Portions were also filmed at CFB Borden,  CFB Toronto and CFB Lahr in West Germany. The Canadian Armed Forces also provided aircraft, armoured fighting vehicles (including Centurion tanks), and soldiers for the filming.

The flag of the film's unnamed republic, "a generic country with no specific geography or culture", was green, yellow and black.

It was one of the first films financed under Canadian tax concessions.

Reception
The film won the Best Screenplay award at the Canadian Film Awards.

Notes

External links
 
 

1978 films
Films based on non-fiction books
Canadian political thriller films
Canadian thriller drama films
British political thriller films
British thriller drama films
English-language Canadian films
Films directed by Martyn Burke
Films about rebellions
Films about coups d'état
1970s thriller films
Films with screenplays by Martyn Burke
Films set in Europe
Films scored by Ken Thorne
1970s English-language films
Films shot in Toronto
Films shot in Germany
1970s Canadian films
1970s British films